Lyubomir Hranov (2 July 1923 – 27 August 2011) was a Bulgarian international footballer who played as a midfielder for clubs in Bulgaria.

Career
Hranov began playing football for local clubs ZhSK Sofia and PFC Levski Sofia. He won the Bulgarian league five times and won the Bulgarian Cup three times. He was the league top-scorer in 1950 with 11 goals.

He made two appearances for the Bulgaria national football team.

After he retired from playing football, Hranov managed several clubs, including FC Cherveno Zname Kyustendil, FC Arda, FC Bdin, FC Dorostol and FC Lokomotiv Gorna Oryahovitsa.

Honours
Levski Sofia

 Bulgarian champion – 1946, 1949, 1950, 1953
 Bulgarian Cup – 1946, 1949, 1950

Personal
Hranov died at age 88 on 28 August 2011.

References

External links
Profile at Levskisofia.info

1923 births
2011 deaths
Bulgarian footballers
Bulgaria international footballers
FC Lokomotiv 1929 Sofia players
PFC Levski Sofia players
First Professional Football League (Bulgaria) players
Bulgarian football managers
Association football midfielders